Mandera Prison, also sometimes spelled as Mandhera or Mandheera Prison, is an isolated, high-security prison located in the town of Mandera in the Maroodi Jeex Region of the self-proclaimed nation of Somaliland, about  northeast of the capital Hargeisa. The prison has been in operation since Somaliland was still a British protectorate, and to this day functions as a major prison within the region.

There is a generally poor reception of the prison from those who have been inside in recent years, specifically guards mistreating inmates in some instances, and the deteriorating state of the building itself after years of continuous use. Furthermore, the prison in recent decades has grown to hold a disproportionate number of juvenile prisoners for minor crimes. Both domestic and foreign observers have condemned the prison for detaining journalists and non-ruling party politicians en masse, and for allowing executions.

History 
The exact date, when Mandera Prison was built or became operational, is unknown. Its earliest records show that it was constructed by the British Empire, as the main central prison for British Somaliland, sometime during the occupation of the region beginning in 1884. It was the only prison in the protectorate equipped to hold "all long-term prisoners" before the formation of the Somaliland Prison Service (modern day Somaliland Custodial Corps) on 1 November 1949. The detailed 1953 Prison Rules which reformatted the prison systems in the protectorate kept Mandera Prison as the main central prison. Mandera would continue to remain an important central prison throughout the rule of the following Somali Republic until 1969, and the Somali Democratic Republic until 1991, which both united Somaliland with Somalia. The larger prisons of Somalia at this time outclassed Mandera Prison, making it no longer the largest or highest security prison during the unions.

Somali National Movement attacks 

When the prison came under the control of the following Marxist-Leninist Somali Democratic Republic, it began to hold increasing numbers of political prisoners and those who opposed the government, including those seeking the re-independence of Somaliland. Overseen by the anti-communist Somali National Movement (SNM), two successful attacks were conducted in January 1983 and May 1988 in which all prisoners, numbering in the hundreds including dozens of political prisoners, were released in both instances.

1983 attack 
The first attack, which took place on 2 January 1983, was also the SNM's first military operation against the Somali Democratic government. Operating from a makeshift Ethiopian base, a commando SNM unit's deep infiltration into the nation and sudden attacks caught the Somali National Army off guard, and saw the prison temporarily fall under the SNM's control. The SNM released all 744 of the prisoners detained at Mandera Prison, where they were told the following by Colonel Mohamed Hashi Lihle:

The speech not only motivated many of the Somalis in the prison to join the SNM, but became a major symbol of propaganda in the media across the Somali Democratic Republic, bringing attention to the otherwise politically isolated movement within the nation.

1988 attack 
The second attack, which took place at the dawn of 29 May 1988, was part of the SNM's successful 1988 Hargeisa-Burao offensive. The attack on the prison, which was not originally planned to take place, became necessary after reasonable fear arose that Somali forces would kill the prisoners detained there in retaliation for the SNM's recent successful capture of Adadley. After marching from Adadley through the night of 28 May, SNM forces arrived at dawn at the prison, where they were met with fierce resistance from the defending Somali forces, killing 10 SNM fighters and wounding more. A M40 recoilless rifle was eventually able to penetrate a hole at a weak point of the prison, where the SNM could enter. After the SNM's entrance, the prison's commander, who refused to surrender, was shot on sight, and all 664 inmates of the prison were freed. Among the freed were 34 Ethiopians, Southern Somalis, and former mayor of Hargeisa Barre Langadhe. A vehicle was provided to the former Ethiopian prisoners to transport them back to Jijiga, and the remaining prisoners who wanted to join the SNM were armed. Shortly afterwards, the SNM regrouped and returned to Adadley.

Prison facility 
Many of the basic components of the facility such as the number of cells or the prison's maximum capacity nowadays are not known, or have not been explicitly documented. It is estimated the prison had a capacity of around 400 while under British rule, judging by reports to the Colonial Office in which the prison counted 397 inmates on 31 December 1957 and 391 in 1959, but this capacity is very likely to have increased following various extensions since then. With respect to the state of the prison itself, an August 2007 report by Amnesty International regarded the prison as having poor living conditions. This was later supported by a February 2011 assessment of the prison by the United Nations Office on Drugs and Crime, where the interior of the compound was deemed in need of refurbishment after years of consistent operation. Some former prisoners have also recalled poor bug-treatment at the compound, leading to scarring from repeated insect bites in some instances. Insect bites in the past have not been treated properly by the prison's medical department. Along with reports of abuse against detainees at the nearby police station, the prison complex as a whole has gained an overall poor reputation regarding its quality and treatment of inmates.

Police station and academy 
Mandera Prison is located alongside the first police academy in Somaliland. Positioned separately across from the prison itself, construction of the academy and station began in 1968, and was finished in the late 1960s or early 1970s. The finished buildings were designed to house, feed, and provide basic training for new prison guards and police officers who would gain experience by working at the prison. In modern times; the buildings have on multiple occasions been used to hold detainees awaiting trial, who if found guilty, can quickly be sent to the prison proper. Reports of abuse have surfaced from some detainees who have spent extended periods of time being held at the station.

Prison education programs 
Mandera Prison during British colonial rule hosted a sponsored prison education program which taught blacksmithing, building, carpentry, gardening, tailoring, and poultry farming skills. This education was offered to willing inmates for a dual purpose: of giving them a paying profession to prevent poverty and recidivism, and of transferring any profits from the farms and shops to British government departments. Nowadays, the International Committee of the Red Cross (ICRC) has sponsored the education program since 2014. Whether some of the programs from British rule are still in operation is unknown; because only the teaching of carpentry, welding, and tailoring skills are discussed by the ICRC in a 2016 report. Between Mandera Prison and Puntland's Bosaso Prison, the program regularly serves 180 inmates.

Controversies

Mass juvenile detention 

The prison in recent history has gained a reputation for holding inmates, mainly juveniles, for long sentences that often do not match the severity of the crimes committed. This has led to a growing reliance on paralegals to secure the legal rights of inmates in the prison to an acceleration of their passage through the lengthy criminal justice system. This was not always the case though, as findings from a survey taken between 1948 and 1950 showed the juvenile population in the prison and the nation as a whole decreasing. The reverse has taken place recently, with multiple instances of one- to two-year prison sentences being documented for juveniles convicted of the theft of mobile phones. This population of the prison mainly consisting of underaged schoolchildren was confirmed by the Waddani opposition party leader Abdirahman Mohamed Abdullahi on a visit conducted on 24 November 2022, in which he described the situation as a "gross violation of the detainees' human and civil rights".

Journalist and politician detention 

The prison throughout its history has been used to hold journalists and politicians en masse whose reason for arrest is often only for reporting on unflattering crimes and protests in the nation, or for promoting the opposing parties' beliefs, calling into question the freedom of speech in Somaliland. In modern times, politicians and protesters in support of the opposing Waddani party or more broadly against the current government have been detained in the prison often without due process, and held for an indefinite amount of time. Instances of this occurring in the past year were seen on 9 June 2022, 15 August 2022, and 9 November 2022. Journalist detentions typically receive some form of condemnation and call for immediate release by at least one of the various journalists' rights groups that are active in the region. Such groups have had some success in the past.

Executions 
On multiple occasions; the prison has been recorded as, and condemned for, executing some of its prisoners as recently as in 2022. On both 15 January 2020 and 26 November 2020; six prisoners convicted of murders were sentenced to death and executed by firing squad on the outskirts of the prison. On both occasions, the European Union released statements against the executions, restating their opposition to the "irreversible" form of capital punishment. Another execution by firing squad occurred on 16 February 2022 when four men convicted of the killing of soldiers were executed. These actions were again rebuked, this time by the United Kingdom, whose representative in Hargeisa responded by saying that execution "has no deterrent effect on crime".

Notable inmates 
Below is a list of notable inmates who have served time in Mandera Prison. The information on the table is organized in the order of the name of the detainee, the reason for their notability, the crime committed, the original sentencing for the crime, the year detained, and the year released if available.

References

External links 
 Mandhera Prison Category for all Committee to Protect Journalists reports on Mandera Prison
 Tag: Mandera Prison  Category for all Horn Diplomat reports on Mandera Prison

Buildings and structures in Somaliland
Prisons in Somaliland